Ildikó Rejtő (also known as Györgyné Sági, formerly Jenőné Újlaky; born 11 May 1937) is a retired Hungarian two-time Olympic and five-time World Champion foil fencer.

Early and personal life
She was born in Budapest, Hungary, and is Jewish. She was born deaf. She had had scoliosis since she was a teenager, which caused her father to enroll her in fencing lessons, in order to help straighten her back.

Career highlights 
Because she was deaf, when she started fencing at age 15 she learned by reading written instructions from her coaches.

She won the junior girls world foil championship in 1956–57, and was the Hungarian women's foil champion in 1958. She was the Hungarian Sportswoman of the Year in 1963 and 1964.

She represented Hungary in every Olympics from 1960 to 1976 and won seven Olympic medals, two gold (one each in foil individual and foil team), three silver (three foil team), and two bronze (one each in foil individual and foil team). At the 1960 Olympics in Rome at the age of 23, she won a team silver medal in women's foil. At the 1964 Olympics in Tokyo at the age of 27, she won both an individual and a team gold medal in women's foil. At the 1968 Olympics in Mexico City at the age of 31, she won an individual bronze medal and a team silver medal in women's foil.  At the 1972 Olympics in Munich at the age of 35, she won a team silver medal in women's foil. At the 1976 Olympics in Montreal at the age of 39, she won a team bronze medal in women's foil.

She won the 1963 individual foil World Fencing Championships title, and the 1962, 1967, and 1973 team foil World Championships titles.

As a senior, she won the women's foil competition at the World Veterans Championships in 1999.

Rejtő was inducted as a member of the International Jewish Sports Hall of Fame.

See also
List of select Jewish fencers
List of multiple Olympic medalists in one event
Deaf people in the Olympics

References

External links 
 
 Jewish Sports
 Jews in Sports bio
 
 

1937 births
Living people
Hungarian female foil fencers
Jewish female foil fencers
Olympic fencers of Hungary
Fencers at the 1960 Summer Olympics
Fencers at the 1964 Summer Olympics
Fencers at the 1968 Summer Olympics
Fencers at the 1972 Summer Olympics
Fencers at the 1976 Summer Olympics
Olympic gold medalists for Hungary
Olympic silver medalists for Hungary
Olympic bronze medalists for Hungary
Olympic medalists in fencing
Jewish Hungarian sportspeople
Martial artists from Budapest
Medalists at the 1960 Summer Olympics
Medalists at the 1964 Summer Olympics
Medalists at the 1968 Summer Olympics
Medalists at the 1972 Summer Olympics
Medalists at the 1976 Summer Olympics
Hungarian deaf people
Deaf sportspeople
20th-century Hungarian women